Alex Hall (born 8 June 1999) is an Australian professional baseball catcher in the Milwaukee Brewers organization.

Career
During the 2017 offseason, Hall was signed by the Milwaukee Brewers as a free agent, and was assigned to the AZL Brewers, and spent the season there. Hall spent the 2018 season with AZL Brewers and the Rocky Mountain Vibes. After the 2020 season was cancelled due to the COVID-19 pandemic, he played the 2021 season with the Carolina Mudcats and the Wisconsin Timber Rattlers, and started the 2022 season with the Timber Rattlers. On June 2, he was unexpectedly called up to the major leagues, after starting catcher Omar Narváez was suddenly placed on the COVID-related injured list; Hall did not play for the Brewers, and was designated for assignment the following day.

References

External links

1999 births
Living people
Australian expatriate baseball players in the United States
Perth Heat players
Arizona League Brewers players
Rocky Mountain Vibes players
Carolina Mudcats players
Wisconsin Timber Rattlers players
2023 World Baseball Classic players